The 1990 Women's Mazda World Team Squash Championships were held in Sydney, Australia and took place from October 15 until October 21, 1990.

Results

First round

Pool A

Pool B

Semi finals

Third Place Play Off

Final

References

See also 
World Team Squash Championships
World Squash Federation
World Open (squash)

World Squash Championships
Squash tournaments in Australia
International sports competitions hosted by Australia
Squash
Wom
1990 in women's squash
1990s in Sydney